Tafsīr al-Baghawī, also known as Ma‘ālim al-Tanzīl, is a classical Sunni tafsir (Qur'anic exegesis) by Husayn b. Mas'ūd al-Baghawī (d. 1122), written as an abridgement of Tafsir al-Thalabi by al-Tha'labī (d. 1035). It is generally classified as one of the books of narration-based tafsir, as it collects and presents many statements from the Sahabah and Tabi'oon. The book primarily relies on 11 reliable chains of narrations, which al-Baghawi mentions in the introduction to his work. It currently exists in four volumes and eight volumes in its Lebanon edition and Cairo edition respectively.

Editions
Browse Tafsir Al-Baghawi (arabic)
yeh BOOK ISLAMIC BOOK HAI

See also
List of Sunni books

References

Baghawi